The Diviners is a Canadian television film, which aired on CBC Television in 1993. Directed by Anne Wheeler, the film is an adaptation of the novel The Diviners by Margaret Laurence.

Plot
The storyline follows Morag Gunn from her tough childhood in Manitoba, Canada to middle-age adult life. A key theme of the movie is Morag's search for love. The story also introduces unique characters from the Manawaka series.  The film provides a glimpse into many ways that society creates outcasts socially. The film also explores mythology, as illustrated by Christie's Scottish Piper Gunn, Métis hero Jules Tonnerre, Morag's novel and songs by Skinner and Piquette. As Margaret Laurence's crowning achievement, The Diviners shows that truth and love can be "divined" in many ways.

Cast

References

External links

 

1993 television films
1993 films
CBC Television original films
Films set in Manitoba
Films directed by Anne Wheeler
Films based on Canadian novels
English-language Canadian films
Gemini and Canadian Screen Award for Best Television Film or Miniseries winners
Canadian drama television films
Films based on works by Margaret Laurence
1990s English-language films
1990s Canadian films